Borgå Bollplan is a sports arena in Porvoo, Finland. It is the homeground of Borgå Akilles sports club and used for association football in the summer and bandy in the winter time.

References

Bandy venues in Finland
Buildings and structures in Porvoo